The Serbian People's Party (SNP) is a right-wing populist and national-conservative political party in Serbia. It was formed in 2014 by former members of the Democratic Party of Serbia and is currently led by Nenad Popović.

History 
The SNP was founded in September 2014 in the village of Kriva Reka in the Zlatibor region. Its founding members included Popović, Jovan Palalić, Milan Stamatović (who left the party two years later), and the political philosopher Bogdana Koljević. 

The party's first member of the assembly was Milan Petrić, who had been elected on the list of the Democratic Party in the 2014 election and joined the SNP in March 2015. The SNP subsequently contested the 2016 election on the Progressive Party's Aleksandar Vučić – Serbia Is Winning electoral list and elected three members to the assembly: Jovan Palalić, Ognjen Pantović, and Snežana Petrović.

Popović, who has been the SNP's leader since its founding, was appointed to a ministerial position on June 29, 2017.

Ideology   
The party favors closer ties between Serbia and Russia and opposes Serbian membership in the European Union.

Electoral performance

Parliamentary elections

Presidential elections

References 

2014 establishments in Serbia
Conservative parties in Serbia
Eurosceptic parties in Serbia
National conservative parties
Nationalist parties in Serbia
Political parties established in 2014
Right-wing populism in Serbia
Right-wing populist parties
Serb nationalist parties